Helen Masters (born 10 April 1963) is an English actress who has appeared on stage, film and TV.

Early life
Helen Masters grew up in Warwickshire. She attended Kings High School, Warwick and Solihull School. She went on to study at the Webber Douglas Academy of Dramatic Art.

Personal life
Masters lives in London and is married to John McRoberts with whom she has two children.

Career

Stage

After graduating she made her first stage appearance at the Edinburgh Festival in East and A Clockwork Orange. She then went on to play Laurie in The Traveller at the Leicester Haymarket (1987) which transferred to The Almeida Theatre (1988), Emilie, and later on the role of Madame de Tourvel, in the West End Production of Les Liaisons Dangereuses at the Ambassadors Theatre (1989), Yelena in Marya at the Old Vic directed by Roger Michell (1990), Ellen in "Acid Hearts" at the Finborough Theatre (1992), Emma in Betrayal at the Chester Gateway Theatre (1994). In July 2011, Helen Masters returned to the stage to play the role of Lady Magdalene Danvers in Into Thy Hands, a new play written and directed by Jonathan Holmes at Wiltons Music Hall, London. In March 2011, Masters played Molly in Revolution Square at the Bush Theatre, London, again written and directed by Jonathan Holmes.

Television
Masters's work in television increased during the early 1990s, culminating in her portrayal of D.I. Lucy Lane in the HTV television series Wycliffe from 1994 to 1998. The series starred Jack Shepherd as Det. Superintendent Wycliffe and Jimmy Yuill as D.I. Doug Kersey.

Selected filmography

References

Living people
1963 births
Actresses from Coventry
21st-century English actresses
20th-century English actresses